The Black Cauldron is an adventure game designed by Al Lowe of Sierra On-Line and published in 1986. The game is based on the Disney film The Black Cauldron, which was itself based on the Chronicles of Prydain novel of the same name by Lloyd Alexander. It was made shortly after the first King's Quest game, so it resembles that game in many ways. Along with The Dark Crystal it remains one of only a few adventure games by Sierra to be based on films.

Plot 

The player character is a young assistant pig-keeper named Taran, who undertakes a quest to stop the evil Horned King, who seeks for Hen Wen, the magical pig of the wizard Dallben, for her visionary abilities. With these abilities, the Horned King would be able to discover the Black Cauldron and rule the land.

Taran's first mission is to lead her to the Fair Folk while the Horned King's dragons are looking for them. Should the pig be captured (the game allows either possibility), Taran can go to the Horned King's castle and rescue her. As soon as he is inside, Taran will meet Princess Eilonwy with her magic bauble and may rescue Fflewddur Fflam, as well as discover a Magic Sword.

The Cauldron is in the possession of three witches of Morva who will trade it for the Sword. A dragon grasps the cauldron and Taran goes back to encounter the evil man himself.

There are plot branches and multiple endings depending on many variables, such as whether Hen Wen the pig was saved, how the cauldron was destroyed, and what reward was chosen afterward.

Gameplay 

In order to make the game more accessible to children, Sierra used an innovative idea that would not reappear in the genre for the next 10 years: the text parser was removed in favor of the function keys that performed various actions: F3 would choose an inventory item, F4 would use it, F6 would perform "Use" near the character's location, and F8 would "look". The simplification of the two actions "Look" and "Use" was not reused in Sierra's later games. However, it somewhat resembles the control system of other later simpler point-and-click adventure games, such as the King's Quest VII or The Dig whose interfaces only consisted of "Look" and "Use". Being based on a Disney film, the graphics present some relative 'flexibility', compared to the monolithic and straight sceneries of previous and later games.

Reception 
Antic in 1987 criticized the Atari ST version of The Black Cauldron as "typical of early software for newer computers. It doesn't fully utilize the ST's capabilities", citing the "chunky low-resolution" graphics "obviously ported from another make of computer". However, the magazine concluded that fans of other Sierra adventures would enjoy the game.

Reviews 
 ASM (Aktueller Software Markt) - Aug, 1986
 Computer and Video Games - Aug, 1986

See also 

 List of Disney video games by genre

References

External links 
 The Black Cauldron at Lemon Amiga

 Review in Info
 Review in Page 6

1986 video games
Adventure games
Amiga games
Apple II games
Apple IIGS games
Atari ST games
Disney video games
DOS games
Fantasy video games
ScummVM-supported games
Sierra Entertainment games
The Chronicles of Prydain
Video games based on Celtic mythology
Video games based on films
Video games developed in the United States
Video games set in castles